Qarabolaq or Qareh Bulaq is a small settlement in the Great Pamir in Wakhan District, Badakhshan Province, northeastern Afghanistan.  It lies at an altitude of 4,139 m on the eastern shore of Zorkul lake, near the Afghan border with Tajikistan but also close to the Afghan borders with Pakistan and China.

Climate
Qarabolaq has an alpine tundra climate (Köppen: ET). It has brief, cool summers and long, frigid winters.

See also
Badakhshan Province

References

External links
Satellite map at Maplandia.com

Populated places in Wakhan District
Wakhan
Villages in Afghanistan